Esther Gitman (born September 20, 1939) is an American historian and expert on the Holocaust in Yugoslavia specifically focusing on the Independent State of Croatia.

Early life
In October 1941, Gitman escaped Sarajevo to the Italian zone of occupation on the Adriatic, both managed to survive the Holocaust through the help of Righteous Gentiles. She has lived in the United States since 1972. Before that her family lived in Israel for 19 years, then she moved to Montreal, Quebec, Canada with her husband Israel and only child, her daughter Michal. That is where her husband Israel, earned his PhD and finally, in 1978 they moved to New York City. Michal now has 6 children: She married Dan Drillich in 1992–1993.

Scholarship career
She earned a bachelor's degree in history and sociology from Carleton University in Ottawa, Ontario, Canada, and a graduate degree in criminal justice from Long Island University. She earned a PhD from City University in New York in Jewish history. She began her research into the Croatian-Jewish history in 1999 with her dissertation, entitled Rescue of Jews in the Independent State of Croatia, 1941–1945. In 2002, she received a Fulbright scholarship to travel to Croatia to continue her research. In the 2006–07 academic year Gitman was awarded, by the United States Holocaust Memorial Museum and the Center for Advanced Holocaust Studies, a Barbara and Richard Rosenberg Fellowship for her research.

In 2007 Gitman received a post-doctoral grant from the United States Holocaust Memorial Museum. In 2008, she participated in a conference on Aloysius Cardinal Stepinac, the senior member of the Catholic Church among the Croats in the Second World War. Gitman has compiled databases on Jews from Sarajevo and Zagreb who survived the Holocaust.

In 2011, she published When Courage Prevailed: The Rescue and Survival of Jews in the Independent State of Croatia 1941–1945, with the subject of rescues and survival of Jews in Independent State of Croatia and about the role of Aloysius Cardinal Stepinac during that time. In the interview for the Croatian daily Večernji list, Gitman stated that, for her, "Stepinac is holy man who saved many Jews".

In 2019, for her research and promotion of truth in relation to Croatian history of 20th century, she received the Order of Duke Branimir by Croatian President Kolinda Grabar-Kitarović, as well as published a new book entirely dedicated to Stepinac, titled Alojzije Stepinac - Pillar of Human Rights.

References

1939 births
Living people
Writers from Sarajevo
Bosnia and Herzegovina Jews
Jewish historians
Yugoslav emigrants to Mandatory Palestine
Israeli emigrants to the United States
Jewish Bosnian writers
Fulbright alumni